Ṛ (minuscule: ṛ) is a letter of the Latin alphabet, formed from R with the addition of a dot below the letter. It is used in the transliteration of Afro-Asiatic languages to represent an "emphatic r". It is used in transliterating Indo-Aryan and East Iranian languages to represent either syllabic r or a retroflex flap.

In the International Alphabet of Sanskrit Transliteration used for Sanskrit and related languages, ṛ represents a syllabic r. In transliterations of modern Indo-Aryan languages using ISO 15919 or similar schemes, ṛ represents a retroflex flap /ɽ/

Superscript Ṛ was widely used in 19th and early 20th century English in abbreviations of month and personal names, such as in NOVṚ, DECṚ, and ALEXṚ (Alexander). Particularly common on gravestones.

Encoding
In Unicode, the encodings are: (Latin Extended Additional)
 
 

Latin letters with diacritics